The 2016 IIHF Women's Challenge Cup of Asia Division I was an international women's ice hockey tournament run by the International Ice Hockey Federation. The tournament took place between 22 March and 26 March 2016 in Taipei, Taiwan and was the third edition held since its formation in 2013 under the IIHF Challenge Cup of Asia series of tournaments. Chinese Taipei won the tournament for the second year in a row after winning all four of their round robin games and finishing first in the standings. Thailand finished in second place and Singapore finished third.

Overview
The 2016 IIHF Women's Challenge Cup of Asia Division I began on 22 March 2016 in Taipei, Taiwan with the games played at Annex Ice Rink. Chinese Taipei and Thailand both returned after competing in last years tournament while Hong Kong did not send a team after previously playing in 2014 and 2015. Singapore returned to the competition having last played in 2014 where they finished third and India and Malaysia made their debut appearance in Division I and in international competition.

Chinese Taipei won the tournament after winning all four of their games and finished first in the standings. The win gave Chinese Taipei their second Division I title after previously winning in 2015. Thailand finished second after losing only to Chinese Taipei and won their third Division I silver medal in a row. Singapore finished in third after losing to Chinese Taipei and Thailand and won their second bronze medal, having previously finished third in 2014. Malaysia, who was on debut, won their first international game with a 6–3 victory over India. Thailand's Nuchanat Ponglerkdee was named most valuable player of the tournament by the media. Hui-Chen Yeh of Chinese Taipei finished as the tournaments top scorer with 22 points and was named the tournaments best forward. India's Noor Jahan was named the best goaltender by the media and Sirikam Jittresin of Thailand won the best defenceman award. Chinese Taipei's Tzu-Ting Hsu finished as the tournaments leading goaltender with a save percentage of 94.44.

Standings

Fixtures
All times are local. (NST – UTC+8)

Scoring leaders
List shows the top ten skaters sorted by points, then goals, assists, and the lower penalties in minutes.

Leading goaltenders
Only the top five goaltenders, based on save percentage, who have played at least 40% of their team's minutes are included in this list.

See also
 List of sporting events in Taiwan

References

External links
Tournament page at IIHF.com

IIHF Women's Challenge Cup of Asia Division I
IIHF Women's Challenge Cup of Asia Division I
IIHF Women's Challenge Cup of Asia Division I
IIHF Women's Challenge Cup of Asia
International ice hockey competitions hosted by Taiwan